Isabeau Levito (born March 3, 2007) is an American figure skater. She is the 2022–23 Grand Prix Final silver medalist, a two-time ISU Grand Prix silver medalist, the 2022 CS Nepela Memorial champion, the 2023 U.S. national champion, and the 2022 U.S. national bronze medalist. 

On the junior level Levito is the 2022 Junior World champion, the 2021 JGP France II champion, the 2021 JGP Austria silver medalist, and the 2021 U.S. junior national champion.

Personal life 
Levito was born on March 3, 2007, in Philadelphia, and currently resides in Mount Holly, New Jersey. Her mother, Maria Chiara Garberi Levito, is a clinical embryologist who immigrated to the United States from Italy in 1997. Levito is named after Michelle Pfeiffer's character, Isabeau d'Anjou, in the film Ladyhawke. She speaks English, Italian, and some Russian. 

Levito cites skaters Alena Kostornaia, Evgenia Medvedeva, Elizaveta Tuktamysheva, and Kaori Sakamoto as being her skating inspirations and role models.

Career

Early years 
Levito began learning how to skate in 2010 at the age of three in Mount Laurel, New Jersey. Her mother, a figure skating fan, initially put her in learn-to-skate classes to improve her balance. Levito began taking private lessons with her current coach Yulia Kuznetsova (née Myskina), a former pair skater, at age three. She competed at her first U.S. Figure Skating Championships at the juvenile level in 2018 taking the title; she later won the silver medal in the intermediate category in 2019, the junior silver medal in 2020, and the junior national title in 2021.

2021–22 season: Junior World champion 
Levito made her junior international debut at the 2021 JGP France II, the second of two Junior Grand Prix events held in Courchevel, in August. She won both segments of the competition to take the title ahead of South Korean skater Kim Chae-yeon and Canadian competitor Kaiya Ruiter. At her second event in October which was the 2021 JGP Austria, Levito took the silver medal; Russian skaters Sofia Muravieva placed first and Anastasia Zinina was third. With her win in France, Levito qualified as the fifth-seeded skater to the junior women's event at the 2021–22 Junior Grand Prix Final in Osaka, Japan under the qualification rules established for the 2021–22 season, however she withdrew from the event in November due to injury. The Final was later canceled due to concerns related to the Omicron variant.

After recovering from an unspecified lower-body injury, Levito competed at her first senior level U.S. Championships in January. She placed fourth in the short program and narrowly advanced to second in the free skate to take the bronze medal overall, behind Mariah Bell and Karen Chen. Due to her age, she was ineligible to be named to the American Olympic team.

Levito was supposed to finish her season at the 2022 World Junior Championships, but it was disrupted by the Russian invasion of Ukraine. In response to the invasion, the International Skating Union banned all Russian and Belarusian athletes from competing at the ISU championships. The Russian women had dominated the women's discipline in recent years; their absence made Levito a medal favorite at Junior Worlds. However, due to both the invasion and concerns related to the Omicron variant, the World Junior Championships was not held in Sofia in early March; they were moved to Tallinn, Estonia in mid-April. At Junior Worlds, Levito won the short program, introducing a Lutz-loop combination into competition, with a score of 72.50, 3.12 points ahead of Shin Ji-a of South Korea. She finished second in the free skate, behind Shin, but remained in first overall by 0.54 points and took the gold medal. She was the first American woman to win the World Junior Championships since Rachael Flatt in 2008.

2022–23 season: Senior international debut 
Entering the new quadrennial, Levito said that she was looking ahead to the 2026 Winter Olympics noting, "my mom is from Milano." Though she initially said that she was unsure whether she would compete as a junior or senior, she eventually moved up to the senior level. Levito opened her debut senior season at the Philadelphia Summer International. She placed first in both segments of the competition to win the competition with a score of 207.67, four points ahead of second-place finisher Lindsay Thorngren. In her first appearance on the Challenger circuit, she won the gold medal at the 2022 CS Nepela Memorial.
 
Then Levito was invited to make her senior Grand Prix debut at the 2022 Skate America. She finished second, behind reigning world champion Kaori Sakamoto. Levito afterward said she was glad to perform in her first Grand Prix "in front of a home crowd in America."  At her next competition which was the 2022 MK John Wilson Trophy, Levito placed second in both segments of the competition, including a personal best free skate, to take the silver medal behind Japan's Mai Mihara. These results qualified her for the 2022–23 Grand Prix Final. She was the youngest American to qualify for the Final since Caroline Zhang in 2007.

Competing in the final in Turin, Levito finished fifth in the short program after an edge call on her triple Lutz and the triple toe loop in her jump combination being deemed a quarter underrotated. The free skate segment of the competition was deemed "turbulent", with several higher-ranked skaters struggling. Levito stepped out of her opening jump combination and fell on her triple flip; she was visibly unhappy with her performance at the conclusion, but it proved sufficient to place second in the segment elevating her to second overall. Her silver medal in the final was the first medal for an American woman in the event since Ashley Wagner in 2014. She said afterward that "when I was done with my program I didn't expect to be in the placement I am now, and I am still not realizing it yet. It's so amazing, and I'm so proud."

Levito entered the 2023 U.S. Championships as the heavy favourite for the gold medal, and won the short program by a 0.02 point margin over former champion Bradie Tennell, who was making a gradual return from injury. She won the free skate by a wider margin of 10.19 points over Tennell, winning her first national title.

Heading into a Four Continents Championships held on home soil in Colorado Springs, Levito was considered one of the favourites for the gold medal. She finished second in the short program, 1.34 points behind South Korean Kim Ye-lim, winning a silver small medal. She said that "for the most part, I am satisfied" with the performance. Levito withdrew just before the warmup for the free skate on the following day, citing illness.

Honors and awards 

 Named "Best Newcomer" at the 2023 ISU Skating Awards.

Programs

Competitive highlights 
JGP: Junior Grand Prix. Pewter medals (4th place) awarded only at U.S. national, sectional, and regional events.

Detailed results 
Current personal best scores are highlighted in bold.

Senior results

Junior results

References

External links 
 
 Isabeau Levito at U.S. Figure Skating

2007 births
Living people
People from Mount Holly, New Jersey
American female single skaters
American people of Italian descent
American children
21st-century American women
Sportspeople from Burlington County, New Jersey
Sportspeople from Philadelphia
World Junior Figure Skating Championships medalists